In enzymology, a beta-diketone hydrolase is an enzyme that catalyzes the chemical reaction

nonane-4,6-dione + H2O  pentan-2-one + butanoate

Thus, the two substrates of this enzyme are nonane-4,6-dione and H2O, whereas its two products are 2-pentanone and butanoate.

This enzyme belongs to the family of hydrolases, specifically those acting on carbon-carbon bonds in ketonic substances.  The systematic name of this enzyme class is nonane-4,6-dione acylhydrolase. This enzyme is also called oxidized PVA hydrolase.

Structural studies

References

 
 

EC 3.7.1
Enzymes of known structure